Allan Kierstein Jepsen (born 4 July 1977 in Kolding) is a Danish former professional football player and current U17 manager at FC Midtjylland.

He played as a left back for a number of clubs, spending most of his career with Aalborg Boldspilklub. Jepsen played two games for the Denmark national football team.

Career
Starting his professional career at AGF, Jepsen was a promising talent for many years, and was capped 24 times for the Danish national U21 team, while playing abroad for prominent teams Heerenveen and Hamburg. The young defender, however, never broke into the starting eleven on the highest level, and before the 2000–01 season he returned to the Danish Superliga outfit AaB, poised to replace club legend Jens Jessen. After almost 200 matches for AaB, Jepsen finally achieved a full cap for the Danish national team on 2 June 2005, coming on for Niclas Jensen at the 71st minute in the 1–0 win over Finland.

On 13 March 2006, Jepsen used a clause in his contract as he signed for the Norwegian club Vålerenga for a €335,000 transfer fee. He revealed that the chance of playing in the UEFA Champions League was one of the chief reasons in choosing his new club. In June 2009, Vålerenga and the Danish club Randers made a transfer agreement for Jepsen. The Dane signed a six-month contract with the Danish side. Jepsen played his last match for Vålerenga on 14 June 2009.

Jepsen played 12 games for Randers, but left the club when his contract ran out in January 2010. He returned to Germany, signing for Alemannia Aachen in the German 2. Bundesliga.

References

External links

Danish national team profile 
Career stats by Danish Football Association 

1977 births
Living people
Danish men's footballers
Aarhus Gymnastikforening players
AaB Fodbold players
Vålerenga Fotball players
Hamburger SV players
SC Heerenveen players
Randers FC players
Alemannia Aachen players
AC Horsens players
Denmark international footballers
Denmark under-21 international footballers
People from Kolding
Expatriate footballers in Germany
Expatriate footballers in the Netherlands
Expatriate footballers in Norway
Danish expatriate men's footballers
Bundesliga players
2. Bundesliga players
Eredivisie players
Eliteserien players
Danish Superliga players
Association football defenders
Sportspeople from the Region of Southern Denmark